Lage is a town in the Lippe district of North Rhine-Westphalia, Germany, approximatively 8 km northwest of the administrative centre Detmold. It has 35,099 inhabitants (2016). The coat of arms of Lage depicts a farmer's plough. The city is not far from the Teutoburg Forest. Due to its convenient location Lage developed into a traffic hub in the former Principality of Lippe, today's district of Lippe.

History
Numerous finds indicate a colonization of the location since the Neolithic times (2400 to 1800 b.c.).

Around 900 a.d. the parish church of St. Johann (today's Marktkirche) has been founded on a hillhock at the river Werre and is the origin of today's city Lage. In 1274, Lage is mentioned the first time in a document for the life annuity of the local clergy by the sentence "Jordanus plebanis in Lagis". In 1539, with the election of the first mayor self-administration rights are provable.

In 1843, borough rights were awarded by ruler Leopold II, Prince of Lippe. In the years after 1880 the construction of the railway lines Herford to Detmold (1880) and Bielefeld to Lemgo (1893) linked Lage to the surrounding cities by train and created an interchange station.

During World War I (1914-1918) the hospital served as a military hospital. Sections of the Infantry Regiment 67 were quartered in the town. On 9 January 1933, Adolf Hitler spoke on a central square (Jahnplatz) in Lage. During World War II (1939-1945) several attacks by Allied bombers hit the center of Lage, causing over 60 casualties in the local population and destroying many houses.

In 1970, the city merged to form a large municipality with a population of 32,000 with the surrounding communities Billinghausen, Ehrentrup, Hagen, Hardissen, Hedderhagen, Heiden, Heßloh, Horste, Kachtenhausen / Wellentrup, Müssen, Ohrsen, Pottenhausen, Stapelage, Waddenhausen and Wissentrup after local government reorganization.

Twin towns – sister cities

Lage is twinned with:
 Horsham, England, United Kingdom
 Sankt Johann im Pongau, Austria

Notable people
Heinemann Vogelstein (1841–1911), rabbi
Gottlieb Reber (1880–1959), art collector
Fritz Bracht (1899–1945), Nazi Gauleiter of Upper Silesia

References

External links
 

Lippe
Principality of Lippe